Elias Abbas (born 1 December 2001) is a Swedish singer. Abbas participated in Melodifestivalen 2018 with the song "Mitt Paradis". In 2017, he released his debut single "Min Queen". In February 2019, he released a new single along with Anis Don Demina. Abbas also released the single "Problems", featuring Noad, in 2019. His first single of 2020 was "Big Time", featuring Stress and K27. His family is Palestinian and he is the brother of the Swedish rapper Amir Abbas.

Discography

As lead artist

As featured artist

Notes

References

External links 

Living people
2001 births
Swedish male singers
Swedish people of Palestinian descent
Singers from Stockholm
Melodifestivalen contestants of 2018